Chanar Ghati is a 2017 Pakistani drama serial, aired on TV One. Co-written by Syed Mohammad Ahmed and Umar Khitab, it stars Samiya Mumtaz, Shamyal Tareen, Tipu Shareef, Anoushey Ashraf, Dino Ali and Ali Noor in prominent roles. Chanar Ghati is a haunting story of intense love, betrayal and revenge. Set in the present era and at the time of British Raj, it revolves around the ghosts of two sisters who seek justice and wants to take revenge.

Plot 
While working together in an advertising agency, Maira and Sajid starts falling for each other. One day, Sajid disappears while researching about and in a place called "Chanar Ghati". While everyone looks for Sajid, he encounters strange experiences there. He meets Jahan Ara and Geati Ara who fulfill his every single need. Remain disconnected to the outside world, he feels that something sinister is happening with him. On the other hand, in Sajid and Maira's agency their colleague Junaid who wants to marry Maira, decides to recover him.

Cast 
 Samiya Mumtaz as Jahan Ara
 Shamyal Tareen as Geati Ara
 Tipu Shareef as Sajid
 Anoushey Ashraf as Maira
 Dino Ali as Junaid
 Ali Noor as Ali Rao
 Alyy Khan as Jalal Rao

References 

Pakistani drama television series
2017 Pakistani television series debuts
2017 Pakistani television series endings
TVOne Pakistan
Pakistani period television series
Television shows set in the British Raj
Urdu-language television shows